Ijuí is a Brazilian municipality of Rio Grande do Sul, situated  from the state capital, Porto Alegre. In 2020 its population was 83,764, making it the third most populous city of the Missões region, behind Passo Fundo and Erechim.

Demographics
The town is known as "The Land of Diversified Cultures" due to the various nationalities of its founding immigrants, especially from Latvia and others from Europe.

Ijuí has a variable daily population of approximately 100,000 people, being an important regional centre.

Infrastructure
Ijuí is a university town with major health services, containing one of the best hospitals away from the state capital, the Ijuí Charity Hospital.

The city is served by João Batista Bos Filho Airport.

Sport
EC São Luiz is the local professional football team.

Famous natives 

 Dunga - Former coach of the Brazil National Football Team and former player
 Felipe Mattioni Rohde - Football player of Espanyol
 Paulo César Baier - Football player
 Andressa Urach - Model and TV personality

See also
List of municipalities in Rio Grande do Sul

References 
3. IJUÍ, Prefeitura. http://www.ijui.rs.gov.br/paginas/apresentacao May 29, 2018.

 
Municipalities in Rio Grande do Sul